Hymenobacter daecheongensis  is a Gram-negative, non-spore-forming, strictly aerobic and rod-shaped bacterium from the genus of Hymenobacter which has been isolated from stream sediments from the Daecheong Dam in Korea.

References

External links
Type strain of Hymenobacter daecheongensis at BacDive -  the Bacterial Diversity Metadatabase	

daecheongensis
Bacteria described in 2009